Adrian Voo (born April 30, 1986) is a Malaysian film actor. He came to prominence with supporting roles in the comedy films Amateur Night and Dear Dictator.

Life and career 
Voo was born in Kuala Lumpur, Malaysia. He earned a Bachelor's of Science in Business Administration from San Francisco State University, before studying theatre at New York Film Academy. During his time as a student, he starred in the short films The Departed and It Take Seconds. 

In 2013, Voo starred in direct-to-video thriller films Quarantine L.A. and Seventy-Nine. In 2016, he co-starred in the comedy film Amateur Night alongside Jason Biggs and Janet Montgomery.

Voo was part of the 2018 coming-of-age comedy film Little Bitches where he plays against among others, Jennette McCurdy, Kiersey Clemons and Virginia Gardner. That same year, Voo appeared and served as an executive producer on the satire comedy film Dear Dictator, starring Michael Caine, Odeya Rush and Katie Holmes.

Filmography

References

External links 

 
 

1986 births
Living people
Malaysian male film actors
21st-century Malaysian male actors
Malaysian expatriates in the United States
People from Kuala Lumpur
San Francisco State University alumni
New York Film Academy alumni